St. Mary's Hall may refer to:

United Kingdom
 St. Mary's Hall, Coventry, England
Stonyhurst Saint Mary's Hall, preparatory school to Stonyhurst College, Lancashire, England
St Mary Hall, Oxford, England
St Mary's Hall, Brighton, girls school founded in 1836 and closed in 2009

United States

 St. Mary's Hall at Georgetown University, Washington, D.C.
 St. Mary's Hall, a private school located in San Antonio, Texas, USA
 Doane Academy (formerly St. Mary's Hall - Doane Academy), a private school located in Burlington, New Jersey, USA
 Shattuck-Saint Mary's, a private school located in Faribault, Minnesota, USA

China
 St. Mary's Hall, Shanghai, a girls' school in Shanghai related to St. John's University, Shanghai and St. John's University (Taiwan)

Educational institution disambiguation pages